The Car Over the Lake Album is the third album by American country rock band The Ozark Mountain Daredevils. Recorded in Nashville, Tennessee, it was named after its cheerfully surreal cover illustration, which was borrowed from a poster advertising one of the band's college gigs. This package originally included a 33⅓ rpm red flexi disc record nicknamed The Little Red Record that was only available in the very first pressings of the album. These tracks were included on later CD releases of the album.

Track listing
"Keep On Churnin'" (John Dillon)-2:53
"If I Only Knew" (Larry Lee, Steve Cash)-3:24
"Leatherwood" (Randle Chowning)-3:56
"Cobblestone Mountain" (Steve Cash)-2:25
"Mr. Powell" (Larry Lee)-2:50
"Gypsy Forest" (Randle Chowning, Steve Cash)-2:51
"Thin Ice" (Randle Chowning, Steve Cash)-2:55
"From Time to Time" (Larry Lee, John Dillon)-3:56
"Southern Cross" (Steve Cash, John Dillon)-3:27
"Out on the Sea" (John Dillon, Elizabeth Anderson)-2:39
"Whippoorwill" (Randle Chowning)-5:09
"Establish Yourself" (Bonus)-0:17
"Time Warp" (Bonus)-3:10
"Journey to the Center of Your Heart" (Bonus)-2:52

Charts

Personnel
The Ozark Mountain Daredevils
Steve Cash - vocals, harmonica
Randle Chowning - vocals, guitars, mandolin, harmonica
John Dillon - vocals, guitars, mandolin, harmonica
Buddy Brayfield - vocals, piano, electric piano, organ; oboe on "Gypsy Forest"
Mike Granda - vocals, bass
Larry Lee - vocals, drums, guitars, synthesizer

Additional musicians
Weldon Myrick - pedal steel guitar
Farrell Morris - orchestra bells
Nancy Blake - cello

Production
Producer: David Anderle
Recording and re-mixing engineer: Marty Lewis
Assisted by: Kent Nebergall
Recorded at Quadrafonic Sound Studios. Nashville, Tennessee
Re-mixed at Sunset Sound Recorders. Los Angeles
Mastered by: Doug Sax at the Mastering Lab
Art Direction: Roland Young
Album Design: Chuck Beeson
Front Cover Illustration Murv Jacob
Lettering: Stan Evenson
Back Photos: Jim Mayfield, Billy Higgins. Kansas Film Works 
Photography: Bill Higgins, Jeremy Parkin
Artist Management: Good Karma Productions

References

The Ozark Mountain Daredevils albums
1975 albums
Albums produced by David Anderle
A&M Records albums